Diplock may refer to:

People
Bramah Joseph Diplock, 1903 inventor of the pedrail wheel
Kenneth Diplock, Baron Diplock (1907–1985), English judge and Law Lord
Les Diplock (1899–1983), Australian politician
Philip Russell Diplock (born 1927), British architect

Other
Diplock courts, courts without jury established in Northern Ireland in an attempt to overcome jury intimidation, following the recommendation by Baron Diplock
Diplock Glacier, a glacier in Antarctica